Hurian may refer to:
 Hurian, Gilan
 Hurian, Kermanshah

See also
 Hurrian